Dragons of the North is the first full-length album by the Norwegian Viking metal band Einherjer. The lyrics of the seventh track, "Slaget ved Hafrsfjord" (sic), are taken from Torbjørn Hornklove's 9th-century account of the Battle of Hafrsfjord. The remaining songs have original English language lyrics.

Track listing
 "Dragons of the North" – 4:15
 "Dreamstorm" – 6:28
 "Forever Empire" – 6:42
 "Conquerer" – 7:04
 "Fimbul Winter" – 4:44
 "Storms of the Elder" – 7:53
 "Slaget ved Hafrsfjord" – 6:03 (The Battle at Hafrsfjord)
 "Ballad of the Swords" – 4:58

Music by Storesund/Glesnes/Wold

Lyrics by Glesnes/Storesund/Bjelland except "Slaget ved Hafrsfjord".

Credits
 Rune Bjelland – vocals
 Gerhard Storesund – drums, synthesizer
 Frode Glesnes – guitar
 Audun Wold – guitar, clean vocals
 Stein Sund – bass guitar

References

Einherjer albums
1996 albums